"Another Toothpick" is the 31st episode of the HBO original series The Sopranos and the fifth of the show's third season. It was written by Terence Winter and directed by Jack Bender, and originally aired on March 25, 2001.

Starring
 James Gandolfini as Tony Soprano
 Lorraine Bracco as Dr. Jennifer Melfi 
 Edie Falco as Carmela Soprano
 Michael Imperioli as Christopher Moltisanti
 Dominic Chianese as Corrado Soprano, Jr. 
 Steven Van Zandt as Silvio Dante *
 Tony Sirico as Paulie Gualtieri
 Robert Iler as A.J. Soprano 
 Jamie-Lynn Sigler as Meadow Soprano
 Drea de Matteo as Adriana La Cerva
 Aida Turturro as Janice Soprano
 John Ventimiglia as Artie Bucco
 Steven R. Schirripa as Bobby Baccalieri
 Robert Funaro as Eugene Pontecorvo
 Kathrine Narducci as Charmaine Bucco
 Joe Pantoliano as Ralph Cifaretto

* = credit only

Guest starring
 Tom Aldredge as Hugh De Angelis
 Jason Cerbone as Jackie Aprile, Jr.
 Vince Curatola as Johnny Sack
 Charles S. Dutton as Officer Leon Wilmore
 John Fiore as Gigi Cestone
 Joseph R. Gannascoli as Vito Spatafore
 Frank Pellegrino as Bureau Chief Frank Cubitoso
 Peter Riegert as Ronald Zellman
 Paul Schulze as Father Phil Intintola
 Matt Servitto as Agent Harris
 Suzanne Shepherd as Mary De Angelis
 Brian Tarantina as Mustang Sally
 Vanessa Ferlito as Tina Francesco
 Burt Young as Bobby Baccalieri, Sr.
 Erik Weiner as Manager
 Michael Matera as Carlos

Synopsis

Tony and Carmela have a joint session with Dr. Melfi. It ends in recriminations: Carmela feels the other two have joined against her. Driving home she is tearful; he drives recklessly and is pulled over for speeding by Officer Leon Wilmore, who is black. Tony's charm, his PBA card, and implicit bribery do not work, and Wilmore writes up a ticket. Tony contacts New Jersey Assemblyman Ronald Zellman to get it canceled.

Days later, visiting a lawn ornament store, Tony sees Wilmore working there. He tells Tony, who is smiling sarcastically, that he has been transferred to the property room and can no longer work overtime. This is more drastic than Tony wanted and he asks Zellman to have him reinstated. Tony then has another argument with Meadow about his racist attitudes, and next time he speaks to Zellman he says Wilmore can stay where he is. But he returns to the garden store, makes a purchase, and offers him some additional $100 bills. Wilmore does not deign to take the money.

Meadow takes the lamp from the basement at home to her dorm at Columbia University, and so unknowingly "neutralizes" the FBI's listening operation.

Junior is diagnosed with stomach cancer.

The last customers have left Nuovo Vesuvio and Artie is glad to be alone with Adriana to celebrate a profitable evening. She unexpectedly tells him that Christopher no longer wants her to work as a hostess and, hiding his chagrin, Artie allows her to leave without notice. When Tony and Chris are dining there, a drunken Artie needles Chris, who angrily makes a grab at him. Tony sends Chris out, then angrily grabs Artie himself. Artie says he is in love with Adriana and Tony's anger changes to amusement. He tells him never to utter those words again.

Tony wants to go into business with Artie selling Italian food products. Charmaine nixes the idea, believing Tony only wants another business as a front. During the ensuing argument, she tells Artie that their marriage is over. Artie then has an awkward dinner with Adriana; she withdraws her hand when he tries to take it.

Bryan Spatafore, Vito's brother, is innocently embroiled in a row between Mustang Sally and his girlfriend. Sally viciously assaults Bryan with a golf club, putting him into a coma. For this, Sally has to be killed. He goes into hiding, but is in touch with his godfather, Bobby Baccalieri's father, Bobby, Sr.; the relationship is "in name only", Bobby, Sr. says, and he is assigned the job. But he is dying of lung cancer and can hardly stop coughing. Bobby desperately wants to stop his father from doing it; so does Junior, who goes to see Tony, who refuses to change the plan. Bobby, Sr. himself wants to do it: "It will feel good being useful for a change."

The hit almost goes awry and ends with a struggle, but Bobby Sr. succeeds in killing Sally and his friend. After the killings, his face smeared with Sally's blood, he finds some cigarettes and starts smoking; still smoking while driving away, he has a coughing fit and slumps onto the wheel; the car crashes and he is killed.

Deceased
 Febby Viola: died of cancer; Carmela's uncle
 Mustang Sally: shot and killed by Robert Baccalieri Sr. on orders by Tony Soprano and Gigi Cestone
 Carlos: Mustang Sally's friend; shot for being a witness to his murder
 Bobby Baccalieri, Sr.: Crashed his car while suffering a coughing fit brought on by his lung cancer

Title reference
 Janice claims that Livia often described a person who was dying of cancer as "another toothpick."

Cultural references
 When Tony is pulled over by the traffic officer, when he pulls out his wallet and shows his New Jersey Association card the name on his card is "Matthew J. Madonna" this could be a reference to Matthew Madonna a Lucchese captain who went on to serve as the acting boss.
 As Bobby Sr. visits Mustang Sally and Carlos, before their deaths, the two were watching Sally Jessy Raphael's talk show on TV.
 In the scene where Junior tells Bobby he has cancer, the movie playing on the television is The Devil at 4 O'Clock with Frank Sinatra.
 The lawn ornament store that Wilmore works at is "Fountains of Wayne", which was a real store in Wayne, New Jersey that closed in 2009; the store was the namesake of the band of the same name.

 Ralphie repeatedly discusses Gladiator, starring Russell Crowe.

Production
Going into the third season, this episode marks the first time the show's leading ladies, Lorraine Bracco and Edie Falco as Dr. Melfi and Carmela Soprano, spoke to each other face-to-face. Their two previous conversations had taken place over the phone, while they had only caught a glimpse of each other in season 1, when Carmela drove Tony to meet Melfi for a session in her car.

Music 
 The song played over the end credits is "Shuck Dub" by R. L. Burnside. 
 Meadow Soprano sings along to The Corrs' "Breathless" while listening to headphones.
 The song playing on the radio in Bobby Baccalieri Sr.'s Lumina as he is driving away from the murder scene is "Sister Golden Hair" by America; Bobby Sr.'s car crashes as the line "I just can't make it" was sung in the main chorus.
 The song playing in the restaurant when Artie and Charmaine are arguing and she says she will divorce him is "Jim Dandy" sung by LaVern Baker.
 The piece played while Artie Bucco and Adriana have dinner is "Concierto de Aranjuez" by Joaquin Rodrigo.

Filming locations 
Listed in order of first appearance:

 Totowa, New Jersey
 Newark, New Jersey
 St. Patrick's Church in Jersey City, New Jersey
 Long Island City, Queens
 Jersey City, New Jersey
 Fountains of Wayne in Wayne, New Jersey
 Garfield, New Jersey
 Hackensack, New Jersey
 Robert Treat Hotel in Newark, New Jersey

References

External links
 "Another Toothpick" at HBO
 
 "Another Toothpick" review by The A.V. Club
 "Another Toothpick" review by Entertainment Weekly

The Sopranos (season 3) episodes
2001 American television episodes
Television episodes written by Terence Winter